Karl David van Hoesen (1926 – October 3, 2016) was former principal bassoonist of the Rochester Philharmonic Orchestra and Professor emeritus of the University of Rochester, Eastman  School of Music as  chair of the Wind, Brass and Percussion Department.
In 1950 he graduated from the Eastman School of Music in New York, USA, with a bachelor's degree. From 1950 to 1954 he was professor of bassoon at the Oberlin Conservatory of Music  and at the Cleveland Institute of Music (1952–54) after which he joined the Eastman faculty. He was also the second bassoonist of the Cleveland Orchestra from 1952-1954.

Career
He played the bassoon in the Lake Placid Sinfonietta starting in 1947 and  retired from  teaching in 1991. He died in Pittsburgh, PA on October 3, 2016.

References

External links

1926 births
2016 deaths
American classical bassoonists
Eastman School of Music faculty
Cleveland Institute of Music faculty
Oberlin Conservatory of Music faculty
20th-century classical musicians